The Jazz Composer's Orchestra is a 1968 album by the Jazz Composer's Orchestra recorded over a period of six months with Michael Mantler as composer, leader and producer. Many of the key figures in avant-garde jazz from the time contributed on the album including Don Cherry, Pharoah Sanders, Gato Barbieri, Larry Coryell, Roswell Rudd, and Carla Bley. The album's finale features a two-part concerto for Cecil Taylor and orchestra.

Mantler "updated" the album in 2014 as The Jazz Composer's Orchestra Update on ECM Records. It features the Nouvelle Cuisine Big Band, an orchestra with parallel instrumentation conducted by Christoph Cech and new soloists: Michael Mantler (trumpet), Bjarne Roupé (guitar), Wolfgang Puschnig (alto saxophone), Harry Sokal (tenor saxophone), David Helbock (piano), and the radio.string.quartet.vienna.

Reception 
Langdon Winner's Rolling Stone review stated "This is a record which all rock musicians as well as general audiences should listen to with care. The first JCOA album is a summit meeting on the Mount Olympus of contemporary jazz which deserves wide attention... By any standard of musical excellence it is a masterpiece."

Brian Olewnick of Allmusic stated: "The breadth of this piece, its expansiveness, and its tension between order and chaos is one of the single high-water marks of avant-garde jazz. Communications is a masterwork in and of itself and laid the basis for stunning work by others in decades hence, notably Barry Guy and his London Jazz Composer's Orchestra. It's an essential document for anyone interested in avant jazz and late-20th century creative music."

Track listing 
All tracks by Michael Mantler

 "Communications #8" – 14:03
 "Communications #9" – 8:14
 "Communications #10" – 13:42
 "Preview" – 3:29
 "Communications #11" (part 1) – 15:32
 "Communications #11" (part 2) – 18:14

Personnel 
 Michael Mantler – conductor, composer, producer
 Don Cherry – cornet, trumpet
 Randy Brecker – flugelhorn
 Stephen Furtado – flugelhorn
 Lloyd Michels – flugelhorn
 Bob Northern – French horn
 Julius Watkins – French horn
 Jimmy Knepper – trombone
 Roswell Rudd – trombone
 Jack Jeffers – bass trombone
 Howard Johnson – tuba
 Al Gibbons – soprano saxophone
 Steve Lacy – soprano saxophone
 Steve Marcus – soprano saxophone
 Bob Donovan – alto saxophone
 Gene Hull – alto saxophone
 Jimmy Lyons – alto saxophone
 Frank Wess – alto saxophone
 George Barrow – tenor saxophone
 Gato Barbieri – tenor saxophone
 Pharoah Sanders – tenor saxophone
 Lew Tabackin – tenor saxophone
 Charles Davis – baritone saxophone
 Carla Bley – piano
 Cecil Taylor – piano, liner notes
 Larry Coryell – guitar
 Kent Carter – bass
 Ron Carter – bass
 Bob Cunningham – bass
 Richard Davis – bass
 Eddie Gómez – bass
 Charlie Haden – bass
 Reggie Johnson – bass
 Alan Silva – bass
 Steve Swallow – bass
 Reggie Workman – bass
 Andrew Cyrille – drums
 Beaver Harris – drums

Production
 Paul Goodman – engineer
 Paul Haines – liner notes
 Paul McDonough – artwork, cover design
 Timothy Marquand – liner notes

References 

1968 albums
Jazz Composer's Orchestra albums
Cecil Taylor albums
ECM Records albums
Albums produced by Michael Mantler
JCOA Records albums